Nagisa Ikemoto (池本凪沙, Ikemoto Nagisa, born 25 August 2002) is a Japanese swimmer. She competed in the women's 4 × 200 metre freestyle relay at the 2020 Summer Olympics.

At the 2018 Junior Pan Pacific Swimming Championships, held in Suva, Fiji, Ikemoto won four bronze medals, one each in the 200 metre freestyle, 4×200 metre freestyle relay, 4×100 metre medley relay, 4×100 metre mixed medley relay.

References

External links
 

2002 births
Living people
Japanese female freestyle swimmers
Olympic swimmers of Japan
Swimmers at the 2020 Summer Olympics
Place of birth missing (living people)
Swimmers at the 2018 Summer Youth Olympics
21st-century Japanese women